Chaturshringi Hill - is a hill in Pune, Maharashtra state in west India.
There is a famous temple of Goddess Chaturshingi (also known as Goddess Ambareshwari) at the top of this hill.

It is close to the intersection of University Road, Baner Road and Pashan Road and also Senapati Bapat Road.
Attractions nearby, besides the temple, are University of Pune and E Square.

Hills of Pune